Little Joe II was an American rocket used from 1963 to 1966 for five uncrewed tests of the Apollo spacecraft launch escape system (LES), and to verify the performance of the command module parachute recovery system in abort mode. It was named after a similar rocket designed for the same function in Project Mercury. Launched from White Sands Missile Range in New Mexico, it was the smallest of four launch rockets used in the Apollo program.

Background 

Man-rating of the Apollo launch escape system was planned to be accomplished at minimum cost early in the program. Since there were no reasonably priced launch vehicles with the payload capability and thrust versatility that could meet the requirements of the planned tests, a contract was awarded for the development and construction of a specialized launch vehicle. The rocket's predecessor, Little Joe, had been used in testing the launch escape system for the Mercury spacecraft from 1959 to 1960.

The program was originally planned to be conducted at the U.S. Air Force Eastern Test Range at Cape Kennedy, Florida. However, because of a heavy schedule of high-priority launches at that facility, other possible launch sites were evaluated including Wallops Flight Facility, Wallops Island, Virginia, and Eglin Air Force Base, Florida. Launch Complex 36 at White Sands Missile Range, previously used for Redstone missile tests, was ultimately selected as the most suitable for meeting schedule and support requirements. White Sands also allowed land recovery which was less costly and complicated than the water recovery that would have been required at the Eastern Test Range or at the NASA Wallops Island facility.

The program was conducted under the direction of the Manned Spacecraft Center (now Johnson Space Center), Houston, Texas, with joint participation by the prime contractors for the launch vehicle (General Dynamics/Convair) and spacecraft (North American Rockwell). The White Sands Missile Range administrative, range, and technical organizations provided the facilities, resources, and services required. These included range safety, radar and camera tracking, command transmission, real-time data displays, photography, telemetry data acquisition, data reduction, and recovery operations.

Design 
Little Joe II was a single-stage, solid-propellant rocket which used a booster motor developed for the Recruit rocket, and a sustainer motor developed for the Algol stage of the Scout rocket family. It could fly with a variable number of booster and sustainer motors, but all were contained within a single airframe.

Development 
Fabrication of the detail parts for the first vehicle started in August 1962, and the final factory systems checkout was completed in July 1963. There was an original fixed-fin configuration and a later version using flight controls.

The vehicle was sized to match the diameter of the Apollo spacecraft service module and to suit the length of the Algol rocket motors. Aerodynamic fins were sized to assure that the vehicle was inherently stable. The structural design was based on a gross weight of 220,000 pounds (100,000 kg), of which 80,000 pounds (36,000 kg) was payload. The structure was also designed for sequential firing with a possible 10-second overlap of four first-stage and three second-stage sustainer motors. Sustainer thrust was provided by Algol solid-propellant motors. The versatility of performance was achieved by varying the number and firing sequence of the primary motors (capability of up to seven) required to perform the mission. Recruit rocket motors were used for booster motors as required to supplement lift-off thrust.

A simplified design, tooling, and manufacturing concept was used to limit the number of vehicle components, reduce construction time, and hold vehicle cost to a minimum. Because overall weight was not a limiting factor in the design, over designing of primary structural members greatly reduced the number and complexity of structural proof tests. Whenever possible, vehicle systems were designed to use readily available off-the-shelf components that had proven reliability from use in other aerospace programs, and this further reduced overall costs by minimizing the amount of qualification testing required.

The Little Joe II launch vehicle proved to be very acceptable for use in this program. Two difficulties were experienced. The Qualification Test Vehicle (QTV) did not destruct when commanded to do so because improperly installed primacord did not propagate the initial detonation to the shaped charges on the Algol motor case. The fourth mission (A-003) launch vehicle became uncontrolled about 2.5 seconds after lift-off when an aerodynamic fin moved to a hard over position as the result of an electronic failure. These problems were corrected and the abort test program was completed.

Flights
The Qualification Test Vehicle launch, on 28 August 1963, carried a dummy payload consisting of an aluminum shell in the basic shape of the Apollo command module, with an inert LES attached, and demonstrated the rocket would work for the A-001 launch. This occurred on 13 May 1964, with a boilerplate BP-12 command module, and performed the first successful abort using a live LES. A third launch on 8 December 1964, using BP-23, tested the effectiveness of the LES when the pressures and stresses on the spacecraft were similar to what they would be during a Saturn IB or Saturn V launch. The fourth flight, with BP-22 on 19 May 1965, was designed to test the escape system at a high altitude (although the abort actually occurred at low altitude due to a failure of the Little Joe II booster). The final launch, on 20 January 1966, carried the first production spacecraft, CSM-002.

Minor spacecraft design deficiencies in the parachute reefing cutters, the drogue and main parachute deployment mortar mountings, and the command and service module umbilical cutters were found and corrected before the crewed Apollo flights began. However, all command modules flown achieved satisfactory landing conditions and confirmed that, had they been crewed spacecraft, the crew would have survived the abort conditions.

In addition, two pad abort tests were conducted in which the launch escape system was activated at ground level.

Launch configuration summary

Surviving examples 
 New Mexico Museum of Space History, Alamogordo, New Mexico 
 Johnson Space Center, Houston, Texas

Specifications 
 Little Joe II
 Thrust: 49 to 1,766 kN
 Length: 10.1 m without - CM/SM/LES
 Length: 26.2 m with CM/SM/LES
 Diameter: 3.9 m body
 Fin span: 8.7 m
 Weight: 25,900 to 80,300 kg
 Propellant: solid
 Burn time: ~50 s
 Algol motor
 Thrust: 465 kN each
 Length: 9.1 m
 Diameter: 1 m
 Weight full: 10,180 kg
 Weight empty: 1,900 kg
 Propellant: solid
 Burn time: 40 s
 Recruit motor (Thiokol XM19)
 Thrust: 167 kN
 Length: 2.7 m
 Diameter: 0.23 m
 Weight: 159 kg
 Propellant: solid
 Burn time: 1.53 s

References

External links 
 The Apollo Spacecraft: A Chronology
 Apollo Program Summary Report
 Little Joe II Qualification Test Flight Report - September 1963 (PDF)
 Little Joe II Progress Report - December 1964 (PDF)
 Little Joe II Mission A-003 - April 1965 (PDF)
 Little Joe II test launch vehicle NASA Project Apollo. Volume 1 Management - May 1966 (PDF)
 Little Joe II test launch vehicle NASA Project Apollo. Volume 2 - Technical summary - May 1966 (PDF)
 NASA TN D-7083: Launch Escape Propulsion Subsystem
 Little Joe II @ Johnson Space Center, Houston, TX

Apollo program hardware
NASA space launch vehicles

bg:Литъл Джо (ракета)